Judith Meierhenry (born January 20, 1944) is a former Associate Justice and the first woman to serve on the South Dakota Supreme Court.

Early life and education
Meierhenry attended the University of South Dakota, receiving her Bachelor of Science in 1966, her Master's degree in English in 1968, and her Juris Doctor from the University of South Dakota School of Law in 1977. She lived in Vermillion, South Dakota and practiced law there.

Career
In 1979 South Dakota Governor Bill Janklow appointed her to serve in the State Economic Opportunity Office. In 1980 she became state Secretary of Labor, and in 1983 she became state Secretary of Education and Cultural Affairs. From 1985 through 1988 she served as senior manager and assistant general counsel for Citibank South Dakota in Sioux Falls.

Meierhenry was appointed judge of the Second Circuit Court on December 16, 1988 by Governor George S. Mickelson and presiding judge of the Second Circuit Court in 1997. In November 2002 Governor Janklow appointed her to the South Dakota Supreme Court, and she served until her retirement in June 2011.

Personal life
Meierhenry's husband, Mark V. Meierhenry, served as Attorney General of South Dakota from 1979 to 1987.

Meierhenry had her first child in 1961, Todd Meierhenry, and her second child in 1965, Mary Meierhenry.

See also
List of female state supreme court justices

References

1944 births
Living people
South Dakota lawyers
South Dakota state court judges
Justices of the South Dakota Supreme Court
Politicians from Sioux Falls, South Dakota
American women judges
Women in South Dakota politics
University of South Dakota alumni
20th-century American politicians
20th-century American women politicians
People from Vermillion, South Dakota
21st-century American women
21st-century American women judges
21st-century American judges